The following is a list of Labor Commissioners of North Dakota. The office was established in 1966 when it, along with the North Dakota Agriculture Commissioner, split from the North Dakota Commissioner of Agriculture and Labor. The office was an elected position on the no-party ballot from 1966 to 1998. Since 1999, the commissioner has been appointed by the Governor of North Dakota, and is part of the North Dakota State Cabinet.

See also
North Dakota Labor Commissioner

External links
State of North Dakota official website

Government of North Dakota
Labor